Macrarene digitata is a species of sea snail, a marine gastropod mollusk in the family Liotiidae.

Description
The maximum reported size of the shell is 6.7 mm.

Distribution
This species occurs in the Atlantic Ocean off Brazil at depths between 40 m and 146 m.

References

 McLean, J. H., R. S. Absalao, R. L. dos Santos Cruz. 1988. A new species of Macrarene (Turbinidae: Liotiinae) from Brazil. Nautilus 102: 99-101

External links
 To Biodiversity Heritage Library (1 publication)
 To Encyclopedia of Life
 To World Register of Marine Species
 

digitata
Gastropods described in 1988